Adyghe Maq is the main Adyghe language newspaper. It is published in the capital of the Adyghe Republic, Maykop, five times a week. It was founded in 1923 and was printed in each of the respective Adyghe alphabets used at the time: the Arabic alphabet until 1927, Latin until 1938 and Cyrillic since. It was printed in the city of Krasnodar until 1936.

References 

Newspapers published in Russia
Socialisticheske Adygei
1923 establishments in Russia